Yustyn Hrihorovych Pigulyak (Ukrainian: Юстин Григорович Пігуляк; 2 June 1845, Mamaivtsi, Chernivtsi Raion - 2 June 1919, Chernivtsi) was a Ukrainian painter, portraitist and public figure in Bukovina.

Biography 
He was born to the family of a rural deacon. After finishing elementary school, on the advice of a teacher, his father enrolled him at a gymnasium in Chernivtsi. There, he showed an aptitude for drawing. This led to lessons at the Academy of Fine Arts, Vienna. For his senior "thesis" painting, he presented a copy of The Three Graces by Rubens, that was judged to be equal in technique to the original.

In 1874, he returned to Chernivtsi and became a drawing teacher at the German-language Realschule. He remained there until his retirement in 1906. Many of the students later recalled that he often broke the rules and spoke to them in Ukrainian. 

His wages were insufficient to support a large family, so he devoted much of his personal time to painting portraits. Most of them involved wealthy foreigners, but he also took time to paint well-known Ukrainian figures. 

He also participated in public and social activities. For a time, he served as its treasurer. He also sang in the local Ukrainian choir.

In 1918, he supported the movement to unite Northern Bukovina with the West Ukrainian People's Republic, rather than have it become part of Romania.  

The subsequent occupation by Romania, and the persecution of his friends and family, caused his already frail health to deteriorate and he died in 1919.

His works have not fared well. In 1913, those he sent to the All-Ukrainian Art Exhibition in Kiev disappeared in transit. A huge number were lost or destroyed during the Romanian Occupation.

References

External links

 Appreciation @ the 

1845 births
1919 deaths
Ukrainian painters
Ukrainian male painters
People from Chernivtsi Oblast